Howard Simon (1902–1979) was an American illustrator, painter, and printmaker who is known for his woodcuts.

Simon provided illustrations for several dozen books, and his work is displayed in numerous museums.

External links
Howard Simon profile at Art of the Print

American illustrators
1902 births
1979 deaths